The Eagles Claw Nature Reserve is a protected nature reserve that is located on the south coast of the state of New South Wales, Australia. The reserve was gazetted on 27 March 1986, to give protection to what was then thought to be the only known mainland breeding colony of little penguins in the state.

Description
The location is a scenic attraction deriving its name from the appearance, when viewed from the north, of a bird's three-taloned foot.  It abuts a residential subdivision of Eden.

The reserve encloses a set of four narrow sea gutters, or small bays, surrounded by low cliffs.  Boulders and boulder debris from the cliffs contain crevices and cavities where the penguins nest.  There are dense stands of coastal scrub dominated by bracelet honey myrtle above the cliffs.

See also

 Protected areas of New South Wales

References 

Nature reserves in New South Wales
South Coast (New South Wales)
Protected areas established in 1986
1986 establishments in Australia
Bega Valley Shire